The 1998 Hawaii Rainbow Warriors football team represented the University of Hawaiʻi at Mānoa in the Western Athletic Conference during the 1998 NCAA Division I-A football season. In their third season under head coach Fred von Appen, the Rainbow Warriors compiled a 0–12 record.

Schedule

References

Hawaii
Hawaii Rainbow Warriors football seasons
Hawaii Rainbow Warriors football
College football winless seasons